Église Saint-Josse de Parnes is a Roman Catholic church in Parnes, France. It is a monument historique.

Location
The church is located in the Oise department, in the commune of Parnes.

History
It was declared a monument historique in 1913.

References

Churches in Oise